Eric Martin Hulme (born 14 January 1949) is an English former footballer who made 28 appearances in the Football League playing for Nottingham Forest and Lincoln City as a goalkeeper.

Hulme joined Nottingham Forest from non-league club Spennymoor United in March 1970. He made his Forest debut 18 months later, after an injury to regular goalkeeper Jim Barron in a League Cup tie against Chelsea, making several good saves before Chelsea finally scored after 63 minutes. The Daily Express Steve Curry wrote that "Hulme tried, often with brilliance, sometimes with luck, to preserve Forest's lead. He made saves from Peter Osgood and Tommy Baldwin of a quality one hardly expects from a reserve." He played five times more for the first team before joining Lincoln City of the Fourth Division, initially on loan, in late 1972. He stayed at Lincoln for two seasons, including a loan spell in non-league football with Gainsborough Trinity, and then joined Worksop Town.

He later became a cook.

Notes

References

1949 births
Living people
People from Houghton-le-Spring
Footballers from Tyne and Wear
English footballers
Association football goalkeepers
Spennymoor United F.C. players
Nottingham Forest F.C. players
Lincoln City F.C. players
Gainsborough Trinity F.C. players
Worksop Town F.C. players
English Football League players